Disulfur dichloride is the inorganic compound of sulfur and chlorine with the formula S2Cl2.

Some alternative names for this compound are sulfur monochloride (the name implied by its empirical formula, SCl), disulphur dichloride (British English Spelling) and sulphur monochloride (British English Spelling). S2Cl2 has the structure implied by the formula Cl−S−S−Cl, wherein the angle between the Cla−S−S and S−S−Clb planes is 90°. This structure is referred to as gauche, and is akin to that for H2O2. A rare isomer of S2Cl2 is S=SCl2; this isomer forms transiently when S2Cl2 is exposed to UV-radiation (see thiosulfoxides).

Synthesis, basic properties, reactions
Pure disulfur dichloride is a yellow liquid that "smokes" in moist air due to reaction with water:
2 S2Cl2 + 2 H2O → SO2 + 4 HCl +  S8

It is produced by partial chlorination of elemental sulfur. The reaction proceeds at usable rates at room temperature. In the laboratory, chlorine gas is led into a flask containing elemental sulfur. As disulfur dichloride is formed, the contents become a golden yellow liquid:
S8 + 4 Cl2 → 4 S2Cl2, ΔH = −58.2 kJ/mol
Excess chlorine produces sulfur dichloride, which causes the liquid to become less yellow and more orange-red:
S2Cl2 + Cl2 ⇌ 2 SCl2, ΔH = −40.6 kJ/mol
The reaction is reversible, and upon standing, SCl2 releases chlorine to revert to the disulfur dichloride. Disulfur dichloride has the ability to dissolve large quantities of sulfur, which reflects in part the formation of polysulfanes:
S2Cl2 +  S8 → Sn+2Cl2
Disulfur dichloride can be purified by distillation from excess elemental sulfur.

S2Cl2 also arises from the chlorination of CS2 as in the synthesis of thiophosgene.

Reactions
S2Cl2 hydrolyzes to sulfur dioxide and elemental sulfur. When treated with hydrogen sulfide, polysulfanes are formed as indicated in the following idealized formula:
2 H2S + S2Cl2 → H2S4 + 2 HCl
It reacts with ammonia to give heptasulfur imide (S7NH) and related S−N rings S8−x(NH)x (x = 2, 3).

Applications
S2Cl2 has been used to introduce C−S bonds. In the presence of aluminium chloride (AlCl3), S2Cl2 reacts with benzene to give diphenyl sulfide:
S2Cl2 + 2 C6H6 → (C6H5)2S + 2 HCl +  S8
Anilines (1) react with S2Cl2 in the presence of NaOH to give 1,2,3-benzodithiazolium salts (2) (Herz reaction) which can be transformed into ortho-aminothiophenolates (3), these species are precursors to thioindigo dyes. 
 
It is also used to prepare mustard gas via ethylene at 60 °C (the Levinstein process):
S2Cl2 + 2 C2H4 → (ClC2H4)2S +  S8
Other uses of S2Cl2 include the manufacture of sulfur dyes, insecticides, and synthetic rubbers. It is also used in cold vulcanization of rubbers, as polymerization catalyst for vegetable oils and for hardening soft woods.

Safety and regulation
As S2Cl2 can be used to produce mustard gases, it is listed in Schedule 3 of the Chemical Weapons Convention. Facilities that produce and/or process and/or consume Scheduled chemicals may be subject to control, reporting mechanisms and inspection by the Organisation for the Prohibition of Chemical Weapons.

References

Disulfides
Sulfur chlorides